Michael John Wilkins (born 6 May 1942) is an English former professional footballer who played as a centre forward.

Career
Born in Leeds, Wilkins signed for Bradford City from Ashley Road Methodists in March 1959. He made 1 league appearance for the club, before being released in 1960. He later played for Canterbury City.

Sources

References

1942 births
Living people
English footballers
Bradford City A.F.C. players
Canterbury City F.C. players
English Football League players
Association football forwards